Pro-Kremlin youth movement may refer to:

 Nashi (youth movement)
 Walking Together
 Young Guard of United Russia